Ein Polterabend is an East German film. It was released in 1955.

Cast
Rolf Moebius as Adolf Glassbrenner

External links
 

1955 films
1950s biographical films
1955 comedy films
German biographical films
German comedy films
East German films
1950s German-language films
Films set in Berlin
Films set in the 1830s
1950s German films